Mavora Lakes is a protected area in the South Island of New Zealand consisting of two lakes: North Mavora and South Mavora. The lakes are drained by the Mararoa River. The area is managed by the Department of Conservation, and is part of Te Wahipounamu, a World Heritage Area.

The area was used as a film location for The Lord of the Rings film trilogy.

The park has a rudimentary campsite and a range of tracks.

Geography

The two lakes located west of Lake Wakatipu and east of Lake Te Anau:

 North Mavora
 South Mavora

References

External links

Department of Conservation - Mavora Lakes Park
Mavora Lakes information and access maps - NZFishing.com

Lakes of Southland, New Zealand
Protected areas of Southland, New Zealand
Southland District
2005 establishments in New Zealand
Protected areas established in 2005